Point Defiance Park in Tacoma, Washington, United States, is a large urban park. The  park includes Point Defiance Zoo & Aquarium, the Rose Garden, Rhododendron Garden, beaches, trails, a boardwalk, a boathouse, a Washington State Ferries ferry dock for the Point Defiance-Tahlequah route to Vashon Island, Fort Nisqually, an off-leash dog park, and most notably a stand of old-growth forest. It receives more than three million visitors every year. Point Defiance Park is maintained and operated by Metro Parks Tacoma.

Wildlife
Point Defiance Park offers something for all its visitors, both wildlife and people. Not all the wild animals are confined inside Zoo & Aquarium. From high cliffs overlooking the Tacoma Narrows people can watch bald eagles feed on salmon runs passing through on the strong tidal currents. Their calls can be heard from their nests in the old growth forest that is preserved and make up the northern  of the park.

In winter, sea lions migrating from California feed in the swirling tides beneath the Gig Harbor overlook on the northernmost point of the peninsula. Harbor seals are common near the tip of the point most of the year. Seal pups are frequently observed north of Owen Beach in late summer and early fall (humans and their dogs should keep their distance to avoid spooking the pups). The park also provides habitat for mule deer, red foxes, pileated woodpeckers, Douglas squirrels, and raccoons.

History

Point Defiance Park began as a military reservation after the Wilkes Expedition visited Puget Sound in the 1840s to map the bays and estuaries. Wilkes is thought to have said that with a fort positioned at the point, and at Gig Harbor across the narrows, one could "defy" the world. The high cliffs and prominent location were never used for military operations. In 1888, President Grover Cleveland authorized its use as a public park. By 1890, streetcars brought visitors to wander among the gardens. In 1903, a waterfront pavilion was completed. By 1907 a seaside resort designed by Frederick Heath offered heated saltwater bathing in a pavilion called the Nereides Baths located on a bluff above the boathouse.

Fort Nisqually is a replica of Hudson's Bay Company's presence in the region in the 19th century when the English trading company had trading forts stretching from Fort Vancouver on the Columbia River, Fort Nisqually on south Puget Sound near the Nisqually River and continuing to the Far North to Fort Yukon on the Yukon River in Canadian territory which later became the state of Alaska.

In recent years, Fort Nisqually programs invite traders, trappers and Indian tribes to dress in period costume and return to the fort replica for a weekend of re-enacting this early period of trade and travel through the region by dugout cedar canoe.

In 2019, the city's second-division soccer team renamed itself to Tacoma Defiance in reference to the park.

The park opened Frank Herbert Trail and Dune Peninsula in July 2019 to honor science fiction writer Frank Herbert, known for his Dune novels, who was born in Tacoma. The American Planning Association designated Point Defiance Park as a 2011 Great American Place. 

In 1964, Point Defiance Park was home to the fairytale and nursery rhyme based attraction known as Never Never Land. Created by Alfred Petterson, the park featured various figurine characters from fables such as Humpty Dumpty, Jack and Jill, and the Little Red Riding Hood. The park brought in visitors until 2001 when Metro Parks shut down operations. In September 2021, nearly a decade after several figurines were destroyed in an arson fire, they were put up for auction. The money that was raised was used to support Metro Parks's historical assets and public art.

Features/Recreation

Formal Gardens

The gardens remain today. Visitors find a Japanese Garden, Rose Garden, and Dahlia gardens surrounding the former superintendent's home. The home was built in 1898 in the year of the Yukon Gold Rush. The gardens are located near the park's main entrance on the approach to the Zoo & Aquarium. It is sited on a bluff looking down on a waterfront containing the boathouse, Anthony's Restaurant and Washington State Ferry landing providing access to Vashon Island. Other public gardens on site include the Native Plant, Herb, Fuchsia, and Iris gardens.

The prominent feature of the Japanese Garden is the Pagoda, built in 1914 as a streetcar station. When buses replaced street cars throughout the West, the Pagoda became a waiting area for buses in 1938. In 1963 it was transformed into a center for flower shows and social gatherings. The Pagoda and Lodge were refurbished in 1988. The Pagoda and Lodge are rented throughout the year for weddings and receptions.
In 2011 the Pagoda was heavily damaged in an arson fire but beautifully restored. The Pagoda in 2001 was also the prior home of the figurines from Never Never Land before the arson fire.

Brownfields and boating facilities
After a century of depositing slag into the waters of Puget Sound, Asarco's Tacoma Smelter created a peninsula to form the park's protected harbor. The Tacoma Yacht Club sits on the peninsula's promontory as a guardian of snug harbor. A public boat launch at the entrance of the harbor is part of the park's recreational facilities.

Zoo & Aquarium
Point Defiance Zoo & Aquarium is a 1.1 mile 4 minute drive from Point Defiance Park. Roughly 15 minutes walking.

Science and Math Institute
In the fall of 2009, Tacoma Public Schools opened the Science and Math Institute (SAMI), a science- and math-centered magnet high school within Point Defiance Park. SAMI features classes on the beach, pagoda, forests, and Zoo. Metro Parks was approached by the school district and gave them space for portable classrooms. The school has a concept and schedule similar to the district's other Magnet high school, Tacoma School of the Arts (TSOTA). The SAMI institute features classes on natural sciences and mathematics. SAMI is an early introductory to the STEM classes and possible school routes and lifestyles.

Landscapes and activities
In addition to old-growth forest with 450-year-old Douglas fir (Mountaineer Tree) are 250-foot vertical bluffs exposing rich geology. Groups and individuals regularly gather at the park for picnics, weddings, organized runs, and other special events. In 2022 Five Mile Drive’s outer loop became pedestrian and bicycle only. The park has an off-leash dog park; fee-based attractions include Point Defiance Zoo & Aquarium.

As the largest urban park in Pierce County, the network of roads and trails weaving through the forest preserve provides a quiet retreat for joggers, cyclists, and hikers. Trails are marked with symbols. The outer loop of Five Mile Drive was permanently closed to cars in 2022. There are many hiking trails along Pt. Defiance's cliffs, that have sweeping views of Vashon Island, Dalco Passage, Gig Harbor, and the Tacoma Narrows Bridge. The road network also passes by Fort Nisqually.

On Owen beach you can find kayakers, people fishing, and beach goers. Boating is also a popular practice in the waters of Point Defiance Park. The Marina is a common place for fishing year round. Chinook salmon and squid are two of the most popular catches during the fall, with Slag and Clay banks also being very popular.

The Point Defiance Zoo and Aquarium is a constant year round activity available to park goers.

Community involvement
Tacomans appealed to President Grover Cleveland in 1888 to repurpose Point Defiance from a military reserve to a park; in 1905 President Theodore Roosevelt signed legislation giving city full title to park. The park's first superintendent, Ebenezer Roberts, asked schoolchildren in 1895 to donate rose clippings to start a rose garden; today gardens have expanded to include native plants, herbs, iris, dahlia, and fuchsia; volunteers contribute time and plants. Citywide 2005 Park Bond Program provides $5.5 million to improve Point Defiance Park; projects include restoration of the Pagoda, trail maintenance, soil decontamination and converting mowed turf to habitat plantings. More than 1,500 citizens have engaged in the park's 2005 Park Improvement Bond planning since the process began in 2008.

References

External links

Official website of Point Defiance Park
Virtual tour of Point Defiance Park
Official Point Defiance Zoo and Aquarium website
The News Tribune celebrates the park's 100th anniversary
Fort Nisqually - Official site of Fort Nisqually
Point Defiance Park- from GoSleepGo
Camp 6 Logging Museum

 01
Parks in Pierce County, Washington
North Tacoma, Washington
Regional parks in the United States
Tourist attractions in Tacoma, Washington
Japanese gardens in the United States
1888 establishments in Washington Territory
Protected areas established in 1888